Sanada is a Japanese surname. Notable people with the surname include:

 Asami Sanada (born 1977), Japanese voice actress
, Japanese shogi player
 Juzo Sanada (1923–1994), Japanese baseball player 
 Hiroki Sanada (born 1984), Japanese baseball player
 Hiroyuki Sanada (born 1960), Japanese actor
 Joichiro Sanada (1897–1957), Japanese general
 Keiichi Sanada, professional shogi player
 Masanori Sanada (1968–2011), Japanese football player
 Sanada (wrestler) (Seiya Sanada, born 1988), Japanese professional wrestler
 Takashi Sanada (born 1985), Japanese tennis player

Sanada clan
 Sanada clan, Japanese clan from the 16th century
 Sanada Masayuki (1547–1611), Japanese lord
 Sanada Nobutsuna (1537–1575), Japanese samurai
 Sanada Nobuyuki (1566–1658), Japanese samurai
 Sanada Komatsu (1573–1620), wife of Sanada Nobuyuki
 Sanada Yukimura (1567–1615), Japanese samurai
 Sanada Chikurin-in (1579–1649), wife of Sanada Yukimura 
, Japanese daimyō
 Sanada Yukitaka (1512–1574), Japanese samurai

Fictional characters
 Akihiko Sanada, character in Persona 3 video game
 Kojiroh Sanada, character in The Last Blade video game
 Sheoke Sanada, Japanese supervillain in the Marvel Comics Universe
 Yukariko Sanada, minor character in My-HiME manga series
 Ryo Sanada, one of the main protagonists in Ronin Warriors

See also
 Sanada, Nagano, a former town in Chiisagata District, Nagano Prefecture, Japan
 Sanada Ten Braves, group of ninja

Japanese-language surnames